U.S. Route 70 (abbreviated US-70) is a transcontinental U.S. highway extending from Globe, Arizona to Atlantic, North Carolina. Along the way,  of its route passes through the state of Oklahoma. Entering the state south of Davidson, the highway serves Oklahoma's southern tier before exiting the state east of Broken Bow. It serves the cities of Ardmore, Durant, Hugo, and Idabel, as well as Tillman, Cotton, Jefferson, Carter, Marshall, Bryan, Choctaw, and McCurtain counties.

US-70 was first established in Oklahoma in 1926. The highway's initial path (which entered the state in Cotton County, further east than it does today) included several deviations from the present-day route, serving Walters and following a more northerly course between Ardmore and Madill. US-70 did not enter Tillman County until 1945. The modern route between Ardmore and Madill was not established until 1984 when it received the US-70 designation.

Route description
US-70 enters Oklahoma in Tillman County, crossing the Red River from Texas, concurrent with US-183. The two routes head north into Davidson, where they split; US-183 continues north toward the county seat of Frederick, while US-70 turns due east. It leaves Davidson, passing south of the Hackberry Flat Wildlife Management Area. Continuing east from the SH-54 junction, US-70 next enters Grandfield, where it begins a concurrency with SH-36. The two highways proceed east from this junction, leaving Tillman County, US-70 having traveled for  within its boundaries.

US-70/SH-36 pass into Cotton County, heading southeast along the southern limit of Devol, which is served by SH-70B, a spur from US-70. US-70 then comes to an interchange with Interstate 44 (I-44). This interchange, I-44 exit 5, is the southern terminus of the H. E. Bailey Turnpike. US-277 and US-281 exit the Interstate at this point, forming a triple concurrency with US-70 as it continues east toward Randlett. There, the three routes serve as the southern terminus of SH-70C. At the southeast corner of the Randlett limits, US-277/US-281 turn north, while US-70 continues on its due east course. Further to the east, US-70 serves as the southern terminus of another state highway, SH-65. US-70 then exits Cotton County.

The next county US-70 enters in Oklahoma is Jefferson County. On the southwestern outskirts of town, the route is the northern terminus of SH-79, which connects US-70 to SH-79 in Texas. US-70 runs along the southern edge of Waurika, coming to the eastern terminus of SH-5 and intersecting US-81. The highway then cuts through Cornish and Ringling, intersecting SH-89 in the latter town. US-70 passes into Carter County east of Ringling.

South of Healdton, it is joined by SH-76, which follows US-70 for approximately  before splitting away to the south in Wilson. To the east, US-70 junctions with SH-70A, which heads south to link to SH-76 in downtown Wilson. US-70 then passes through Lone Grove before entering Ardmore. It meets I-35 at a cloverleaf interchange (exit 31) on the city's west side. Here, eastbound US-70 joins southbound I-35, while SH-199 toward downtown Ardmore begins straight ahead. US-70 exits from the interstate at exit 29, turning back to the east and intersecting with US-77. US-70 passes north of Lake Murray, cutting across the northern reaches of Lake Murray State Park and intersecting the main lake access road, SH-77S, twice. East of the lake, the highway leaves Carter County.

After leaving Carter County, US-70 enters the smallest of Oklahoma's 77 counties, Marshall County. On the north side of the city, US-70 approaches a T intersection with US-177 and SH-199; this is the southern terminus of US-177. US-70 turns south, forming a concurrency with SH-199. The two highways head toward downtown Madill, where SH-199 splits off. At the same intersection, US-377/SH-99 join US-70 as it continues south through Madill, splitting away on the south edge of town. US-70 turns southeast, forming the northern terminus of SH-70F before reaching Kingston. There, US-70 intersects several highways at their termini—SH-32, SH-70B (a spur to Lake Texoma), and SH-70A (a spur to New Woodville and McBride). US-70 curves back to the east in Kingston, entering Lake Texoma State Park east of town and crossing the Washita River arm of the lake, which forms the eastern boundary of Marshall County.

Upon reaching the lakeshore, US-70 touches down on Bryan County soil. US-70 heads east, passing along the southern edge of Mead, then enters the city of Durant, the county seat. On the west side of town, it intersects US-70 Bypass, a partial bypass freeway around the western and southern sides of the city. It then has an interchange with the US-69/US-75 freeway before heading into downtown Durant. There, it has brief concurrencies with US-69 BUS and SH-78. US-70 then heads east out of town. In Bokchito, it is the eastern terminus of SH-22. US-70 then proceeds to Bennington, where it intersects SH-70E at its eastern terminus. US-70 heads northeast out of Bennington, then turns back to a due east course to enter Choctaw County.

The first town US-70 serves in Choctaw County is Boswell, where it junctions with SH-109 at that highway's western terminus. US-70 then bisects unincorporated Unger and Jasper, as well as the town of Soper. East of Soper, the route forms a concurrency with US-271. The two highways come to an interchange with the Indian Nation Turnpike on the western outskirts of the county seat, Hugo. This interchange is the southern terminus of the turnpike; US-70 and US-271 merge onto the freeway continuing south from the turnpike, while US-70 BUS and US-271 BUS continue east into town. US-70 and US-271 follow the bypass around the southwestern quadrant of town. On the southern edge of Hugo, the highways intersect US-271 BUS at its other terminus; here, US-271 splits away from US-70 and heads south. This marks the end of the freeway; US-70 continues east as a four-lane divided highway with at-grade intersections. US-70 meets the eastern terminus of US-70 BUS on the eastern outskirts of Hugo. At the eastern limit of town, US-70 meets SH-93 at its southern terminus. The highway then leaves Hugo, passing through unincorporated Fallon and entering Sawyer, where it forms the southern terminus of SH-147. Just to the east of Sawyer is Fort Towson. There, US-70 serves as the eastern terminus of SH-109 and the northern terminus of SH-209. The highway continues east, serving unincorporated Swink, before leaves Choctaw County.

The easternmost county US-70 serves in Oklahoma is McCurtain County. The road heads southeast, passing through Valliant, before intersecting SH-98 west of Millerton. East of SH-98, US-70 bisects Millerton, then continues southeast through Garvin. It then reaches the county seat, Idabel; here, US-70 BYP heads along the west and southwest sides of the city, while mainline US-70 continues east across the northern reaches of the Idabel city limits. In the northeast corner of town, US-70 intersects US-259/SH-3, turning north to form a concurrency with them (with eastbound US-70 and westbound SH-3 overlapping to form a wrong-way concurrency). The highways proceed to Broken Bow, where they go their separate ways; SH-3 turns west, US-259 continues north, and US-70 turns east. US-70 reaches the state line west of DeQueen, Arkansas; after crossing the line, it passes into Sevier County, Arkansas.

History
US-70 was originally designated in Oklahoma on December 7, 1926, as part of the initial slate of U.S. highways established through the state. US-70 initially entered Oklahoma east of Burkburnett, Texas, proceeded northeast to Randlett, then continued north to an intersection with SH-5 near Emerson, where it turned east, passing through Walters. From Walters, it continued due east into Stephens County to Comanche along present-day SH-53; in Comanche, it turned south along US-81, running through Addington before meeting the present-day US-70 route in Waurika. From Waurika, US-70 followed its present-day route to Ardmore. US-70 continued east from Ardmore along present-day SH-199 and US-177, passing through Dickson and Mannsville before reuniting with the present-day route in Madill. East of Madill, US-70 followed the same basic pathway that it does today.

In 1936, US-70 was realigned in Cotton and Jefferson counties. A section of SH-32 between Randlett and Waurika was also designated as US-70. The old alignment from west of Randlett, through Emerson and Walters, to Comanche, was given the additional designation of U.S. Route 70N on September 1, 1936. East of Comanche, US-70N followed SH-53 through Loco to an intersection with SH-76 south of Fox; US-70N turned south along SH-76, passing through Healdton and ending at the US-70 junction south of town. This route was relatively short-lived, however; it appeared on the April 1937 official state map but was absent from the April 1938 map.

On March 3, 1945, US-70's extent through Oklahoma was greatly expanded. On this date, the highway was realigned between Oklaunion, Texas and Randlett; rather than entering Oklahoma near Burkburnett, the US-70 turned north along US-183 in Oklaunion, entering Oklahoma between there and Davidson, before turning east and proceeding along SH-32 to Randlett. SH-32 would remain designated along US-70 between Randlett and Waurika until September 6, 1966.

Between 1945 and 1951, US-70, SH-32, and SH-36's course between Grandfield and Randlett was more indirect than its modern path, including several right-angle turns. This was remedied on September 10, 1951, with the three highways being shifted to a path following a straighter southeasterly course between the two towns.

During the 1980s, US-70 saw several substantial realignments. On July 14, 1981, the highway was rerouted to bypass Hugo; the old route through town became US-70 BUS. Three years later, on July 7, 1984, US-70 was shifted to its present-day alignment between Ardmore and Madill. After these realignments, the highway followed the same basic path that it does today, with no major changes after 1984.

Spurs

SH-70A

SH-70A (7 mi) is a spur connecting Kingston, Oklahoma to Woodville, McBride, and Lake Texoma.

SH-70A in Wilson

SH-70A (0.9 mi) is also an eastern bypass of Wilson.

SH-70B

SH-70B (6 mi) connects Kingston and Lake Texoma.

SH-70C

SH-70C is a spur into Randlett.

SH-70D

SH-70D is a spur to Devol

SH-70E

SH-70E runs parallel to US-70 starting at SH-78 and traveling east, looping north to connect to its parent route near Bennington.

SH-70F

SH-70F connects Madill to US-70 two miles (3 km) west of Kingston.

SH-209

State Highway 209 is a short state highway in Choctaw County, Oklahoma. It has no lettered spur routes.

Junction list

References

70
 Oklahoma
Transportation in Tillman County, Oklahoma
Transportation in Cotton County, Oklahoma
Transportation in Jefferson County, Oklahoma
Transportation in Carter County, Oklahoma
Transportation in Marshall County, Oklahoma
Transportation in Bryan County, Oklahoma
Transportation in Choctaw County, Oklahoma
Transportation in McCurtain County, Oklahoma